Jose Miguel Mena Rodriguez (November 6, 1986 – October 31, 2021) was a Peruvian-born American jockey in Thoroughbred horse racing who had been competing in the United States from 2003 until his death. He won his 2,000th race in 2020. He was from a Peruvian family involved in horse racing. His father Jose is a retired jockey.

Mena's first horse racing related memory was of Grozny winning the Derby Nacional.

Mena won two Grade 1 races in his career, and in 2015 he swept the major three-year-old stakes races at the Fair Grounds aboard International Star.

Mena was killed on October 31, 2021, when he was struck by a vehicle as a pedestrian on Interstate 64 in Louisville, Kentucky.

Year-end charts

References

1986 births
2021 deaths
Peruvian jockeys
American jockeys
Sportspeople from Lima
Peruvian emigrants to the United States
Road incident deaths in Kentucky
Pedestrian road incident deaths